The 1999 Pan American Games, officially the XIII Pan American Games or the 13th Pan American Games, was a major international multi-sport event that was held from July 23 to August 8, 1999, in Winnipeg, Manitoba, Canada and surrounding towns and cities. Canoeing competitions started the day before the games officially begun. Approximately 5,000 athletes from 42 nations participated at the games. A total of 330 medal events in 34 sports and 42 disciplines.

Financially, the 1999 games were a success, generating a surplus of $8.9 million through a combination of fiscal restraint and the contribution of nearly 20,000 volunteers.

The 1999 Pan American Games were the second Pan American Games hosted by Canada and Winnipeg. Previously, Winnipeg hosted the 1967 Pan American Games.

Bidding process

Winnipeg beat both Santo Domingo, Dominican Republic and Bogota, Colombia in 1994 to win hosting rights for the event.

In 1988, a delegation from Winnipeg announced that once it got approval from the Canadian Olympic Association, the city would submit a bid to host the 1999 Pan American Games. On December 5, 1992, Winnipeg secured the Canadian bidding rights, defeating Toronto by one vote. Other Canadian cities in the running were Halifax, Edmonton, and Sherbrooke. Toronto would later go on to host the 2015 Pan American Games, 16 years later.

Any country that had previously held the games were allotted two votes; those countries were Argentina, Brazil, Canada, Colombia, Mexico, the United States, and Venezuela, making 50 votes in total, and a city needed majority vote (26) to win.

After the first round of voting, Bogotá was forced to drop out having the fewest votes with 10. In the second round, Winnipeg and Santo Domingo reached a 25-to-25 tie. Canadian Committee Co-Chairman Don Mackenzie convinced the Olympic Committees in the third round, focusing on the fact that "Santo Domingo had no place for water-skiing, but Portage la Prairie has one of the best water-skiing facilities in Canada." Winnipeg went on to defeat Santo Domingo by a vote of 28 to 22. Santo Domingo later won the rights to the next games in 2003.

Development and preparation

Venues

A total of 32 sporting venues were used for the games. The Pan Am Pool, built for the 1967 games, featured in the 1999 games for all aquatic events. The venue underwent a $3.3 million dollar renovation for the games. Other new venues included the $8.7 million dollar Investors Group Athletic Centre built for multiple sports and the $12 million dollar CanWest Global Park for the baseball competition.

The main stadium for the games was the Winnipeg Stadium, which staged the ceremonies and the beach volleyball competitions.

A portion of the Pan American Games Society (1999) budget supported the refurbishment of University of Manitoba campus residences to serve as the Athletes Village, the upgrade of various sport and training facilities including the Pan Am Stadium (University Stadium), which had hosted events of the 1967 games.

The Winnipeg Velodrome, also built for the 1967 games, had become obsolete and disused for cycling and so was demolished prior to the 1999 games.  The 1999 games used a temporary facility at Red River Exhibition Park.

The Games

Opening ceremony
The opening ceremony of the 1999 Pan American Games took place on Friday July 23, 1999, beginning at 19:30 p.m. CDT and lasted for two hours and forty-five minutes at the Winnipeg Stadium. A crowd of 30,000 spectators attended the ceremony. Seven Aboriginal Canadians, who were denied entrance into the 1967 Pan American Games, also in Winnipeg, this time entered the stadium with the torch while on canoes. Former Olympians Alwyn Morris and Silken Laumann were the final two torchbearers who lit the cauldron. A total of 3,400 performers took part in the ceremony, including the Winnipeg Symphony Orchestra and singer Jeremy Kushnier. Singer Chantal Kreviazuk sang the national anthem, O Canada as part of the ceremony. Governor General Roméo LeBlanc officially opened the games.

Participating teams
All 42 nations of PASO competed.

Sports
330 events in 34 sports were contested. Beach volleyball and inline hockey made its Pan American Games debut. While a women's tournament in football (soccer) and water polo were contested for the first time.

Numbers in parentheses indicate the number of medal events contested in each sport. 

 Aquatics
 
 
 
 
 
 
 
 
 
 
 
  Canoeing  (12)
 Cycling
  Mountain biking (2)
  Road (4)
  Track (12)
 
 
  Field hockey (2)
 Gymnastics
  Artistic (14)
  Rhythmic (2)
 
 
 
 
 
 
 
 
 
 
 
 
 
 
 
 
 
 
 
 Volleyball

World records set
 Weightlifting – 77 kilogram clean & jerk – 202.5 kilograms hoisted by Idalberto Aranda (Cuba)

Impact of positive drug tests
Perhaps the greatest drug scandal in the sport of track and field, since Ben Johnson's 1988 disqualification, occurred here when the world's only eight foot high jumper Javier Sotomayor tested positive for cocaine.  A Cuban national hero, his subsequent suspension was fought from the highest levels, Fidel Castro claiming it was a conspiracy.  Despite a second positive test for cocaine a few months later, Sotomayor eventually had his suspension reduced by a year, just in time to win a silver medal at the Sydney Olympics.  A year later he retired facing another positive drug test.

Canada was stripped of its gold medal for inline hockey when the team's goaltender Steve Vézina tested positive for multiple banned substances.

Medal count

To sort this table by nation, total medal count, or any other column, click on the  icon next to the column title.

Note
 The medal counts for the United States and Cuba are disputed.

Marketing

Mascots

The 1999 Games' mascot features two birds named Pato (Wood duck) and Lorita (Parrot).

Legacy

The 1999 Pan Am games have been "seen by many Winnipeggers as a chance to put their city squarely in the international spotlight". Winnipeg mayor Glen Murray became nationally well known as a result of the Games and thanks to extensive coverage by the CBC, anchored by CBC Sports' Brian Williams. However, the Games themselves only had mixed success, as the Pan Am Games ranked below the Olympics and Commonwealth Games in international prestige. The Games cost $129 million CDN and finished with a financial surplus of $8.8 million CDN.

Hosts Canada celebrated its medal haul, which was the second best after the United States. However, some considered Canada's results overrated, since the U.S. amassed the most medals with a mostly second-string team while Canada and Cuba had fielded their top national athletes. Cuba also managed more golds than Canada, despite having a smaller roster.

Frequent comparisons were made to the 1967 Pan Am Games, also hosted by Winnipeg, where the United States had fielded many rising stars, such as Mark Spitz. By comparison, the Americans had sent their "B" team to the 1999 Games. No major U.S. networks covered the Pan Am Games, while newspapers only sent second-string reporters instead and the stories never made front page news. Many high-profile athletes, of all nationalities, such as U.S. champion sprinters and Brazilian football players, were in Europe during these Pan Am games, taking part in professional events. South American nations (with the exception of Uruguay) did not send their under-23 male soccer teams after the organizing committee refused to pay appearance money to CONMEBOL.

1999 Parapan American Games, Mexico City

In 1999 Parapan American Games was not hosted in Winnipeg but rather in Mexico City. The inaugural event involved 1,000 athletes from 18 countries competing in four sports.

References

External links
 Winnipeg 1999 - XIII Pan American Games - Official Report (Part 1) at PanamSports.org
 Winnipeg 1999 - XIII Pan American Games - Official Report (Part 2) at PanamSports.org

 
Pan American Games
Pan American Games
P
Sports competitions in Winnipeg
Multi-sport events in Canada
Pan American Games
July 1999 sports events in Canada
August 1999 sports events in Canada
20th century in Winnipeg